Untitled 2 (stylized untitled 2) is the second EP by Los Angeles, California rapper Hodgy Beats. The EP was released on June 1, 2013. The EP features guest appearances from Left Brain and Lee Spielman.

Background
The EP was first announced on May 24, 2013.

Track listing

References

2013 EPs
Hip hop albums by American artists
Odd Future Records albums